The Latady Mountains are a group of mountains rising west of Gardner Inlet, Orville Coast, between Wetmore Glacier and Ketchum Glacier, in southeastern Palmer Land, Antarctica.

The Latady Mountains were seen from the air by the Ronne Antarctic Research Expedition (RARE) on 21 November 1947 and partially surveyed by the Falkland Islands Dependencies Survey and RARE from Stonington Island in December 1947. They were photographed from the air by the U.S. Navy, 1965–67, and mapped from air photographs by the United States Geological Survey. They were named by RARE for William R. Latady, an aerial photographer with the expedition.

See also
Latady Island

References

Sources

External links
 Geological Magazine — A new stratigraphy for the Latady Basin

Mountain ranges of Palmer Land